Gehan is a name. Notable people with this name include:

 Gehan Dassanayake, Sri Lankan cricket player
 Gehan Mendis (born 1955), English cricket player
 George H. Gehan (1901-1968), American lawyer and politiciab
 Mark H. Gehan (1892-1967), American lawyer and politician
 Rodney Gehan (1942–2001), Australian cricket player

Sinhalese masculine given names